Henderson Chapel African Methodist Episcopal Zion Church is a historic African-American church on Church Street in Rutledge, Tennessee.

The church building was constructed in 1890. It is a frame building with a gable entrance, a vernacular design that is commonly seen in rural African-American churches built in the twentieth century.

The church was added to the National Register of Historic Places in 2000.

References

African Methodist Episcopal Zion churches in Tennessee
Churches on the National Register of Historic Places in Tennessee
Churches completed in 1890
Buildings and structures in Grainger County, Tennessee
National Register of Historic Places in Grainger County, Tennessee